Bhagoti is a village in the Almora district of Uttarakhand, India. There are many small villages come under it. The village has its own post office situated in main market. Traditionally it had over 50 families, but many of the families have migrate to cities for higher education and jobs.

Bhagoti market is one of the biggest in the radius of 6 km. It used to be center of over 50 villages once as those villages didn't have road. There are every kind of shops in market. Budhori General Store is one of the oldest shop in the market. It also has a Bhagwati temple at highest peak of village. It believed to be 200 years old temple. in this village there are all kind of facilities like there is proper water facility to everyone house also the condition of road is also improved . every person of the village is involve in agricultural activity. bhagoti village is sourrounded by mountains and it make this village very beautiful . 

Villages in Almora district